Deh Qanun (also Romanized as Deh Qānūn and Deh-e Qānūn; also known as Dehbānū) is a village in Posht Par Rural District, Simakan District, Jahrom County, Fars Province, Iran. At the 2006 census, its population was 169, in 42 families.

References 

Populated places in Jahrom County